NSB may refer to:

Art, entertainment, and media
 Natural Snow Buildings, a French experimental music duo
Nihilist Spasm Band, Canadian free improvisation musical collective
Nu skool breaks, a subgenre of breakbeat music originating during the period between 1998 and 2002
Nature Structural & Molecular Biology, an academic journal
Nippon Shortwave Broadcasting (now Radio Nikkei), a domestic commercial shortwave radio station in Japan

Politics and government
FBI National Security Branch, the United States Federal Bureau of Investigation's branch responsible for investigating threats to national security
National Seamen Board of the Philippines
National Science Board, the governing body of the National Science Foundation
National Security Bureau (Republic of China), the intelligence agency of the Republic of China (Taiwan)
National Socialist Bloc, an historical political movement in Sweden
National Socialist Movement in the Netherlands (Nationaal-Socialistische Beweging), a fascist political movement in the Netherlands (1931–1945)
Naval Submarine Base (United States):
Naval Submarine Base Kings Bay
Naval Submarine Base New London
Norwegian State Railways (1883–1996), a former state-owned railway company that operated most of the railway network in Norway
Vy (transport operator), formerly Norwegian State Railways (Norges Statsbaner), a government-owned railway company which operates most passenger train services in Norway

Education

Competitions
National Science Bowl, a middle and high school academic competition
Scripps National Spelling Bee, a competition in the United States

Schools
Newcastle School for Boys, a British independent school
North Sydney Boys High School, an Australian high school
Northampton School for Boys, a British Secondary School

Other uses
 
 National Savings Bank (Sri Lanka)
 
 Nevada State Bank, a bank in the United States
 New Smyrna Beach, Florida, a city in the United States
 Newtown Savings Bank, a bank in the United States
 Normans Bay railway station, a railway station in Sussex, England